The 2016 Honduran Supercup was a match arranged by the Honduran Liga Nacional which took place on 8 July 2016 between C.D. Honduras Progreso, winners of the 2015–16 Liga Nacional (Apertura tournament) and Club Deportivo Olimpia, winners of the 2015 Honduran Cup.  This was the first Honduran Supercup since 1999 after the 2015 edition was abandoned with no disclosed reason.

Qualified teams

Background
C.D. Honduras Progreso qualified as reigning champions of the 2015–16 Honduran Liga Nacional (Apertura); meanwhile Club Deportivo Olimpia entered as the 2015 Honduran Cup winners.  Honduras Progreso defeated C.D. Motagua in the Apertura finals on penalty shoot-outs after a 4–4 aggregated score.  Olimpia was crowned as Cup winners after a convincingly 3–1 over Platense F.C. in the final match.

The previous match between both sides ended with a 2–2 draw at Estadio Tiburcio Carías Andino on 20 March 2016 for a league encounter.

Match
On a mostly cloudy night, the game started at 19:15 CST as scheduled.  It was the first time in Honduran football that a game was officiated by female referees at a professional level.  Both teams entered the field with their alternate uniforms.  C.D. Honduras Progreso's attacker Ángel Tejeda scored first with a penalty kick at the 26th minute after Club Deportivo Olimpia's defender Bryan Johnson committed a foul inside the 18-yard box.  In the second half, Olimpia made three consecutive goals at the 52nd, 57th and 65th minutes, scored by Carlo Costly, José Fonseca and Bryan Johnson respectively.  Johny Gómez scored the 2–3 for Honduras Progreso at the 69th minute and Nixon Duarte tied the game at the 73rd before the end of regulation.  The match went straight to penalty shoot-outs where Olimpia won 5–4.  During the shoot-outs, Jorge Cardona's kick went so wide and high he send the ball outside the stadium.

See also
 2016–17 Honduran Liga Nacional
 2016–17 Honduran Cup

References

Honduran Supercup
Supercup